Profsoyuznaya may refer to:

Profsoyuznaya (Moscow Metro)
Profsoyuznaya (Volgograd Metro)
Profsoyuznaya Street (Moscow), very important street in South-Western Administrative Okrug
Profsoyuznaya Street (Lipetsk)
Profsoyuznaya Street (Reutov)
Profsoyuznaya Street (Dmitrov)
Profsoyuznaya Street (Rostov-on-Don)